Nebojša Milovanović (born 1974) is a Serbian film, television, theater and voice actor.

Early life 
Nebojša Milovanović was born on 29 September 1974, in the Serbian city of Valjevo, Yugoslavia. Here, he received his elementary and high education. Milovanović graduated from the Faculty of Dramatic Arts, University of Belgrade in 1999.

Career 
Following his graduation, Milovanović entered the Yugoslav Drama Theatre (YDT), playing several notable roles in The Hypochondriac, The Suspicious Face, The Cherry Orchard, Švabica, The Merchant of Venice and so on. Apart from YDT, he also performed in Atelje 212.

Personal life 
Milovanović married Tijana Milovanović, and had three children.

References

External links 
 
 Profile of Milovanović at Sinemaniji.

1974 births
People from Valjevo
Serbian male actors
Serbian male voice actors
Living people